Merlin (also called Neurofibromin 2 or schwannomin) is a cytoskeletal protein. In humans, it is a tumor suppressor protein involved in neurofibromatosis type II. Sequence data reveal its similarity to the ERM protein family.

The name "merlin" is an acronym for "Moesin-Ezrin-Radixin-Like Protein".

Gene
Human merlin is coded by the gene NF2 in Chromosome 22. Mouse merlin gene is located on chromosome 11 and rat merlin gene on chromosome 17. Fruit fly merlin gene (symbol Mer) is located on chromosome 1 and shares 58% similarity to its human homologue.
Other merlin-like genes are known from a wide range of animals, and the derivation of merlin is thought to be in early metazoa. Merlin is a member of the ERM family of proteins including ezrin, moesin, and radixin, which are in the protein 4.1 superfamily of proteins.  Merlin is also known as schwannomin, a name derived from the most common type of tumor in the NF2 patient phenotype, the schwannoma.

Structure
Vertebrate merlin is a 70 kDa protein. There are 10 known isoforms of human merlin molecule (the full molecule being 595 amino acids in length). The two most common of these are also found in the mouse and are called type 1 and type 2, differing by the absence or presence of exon 16 or 17, respectively). All the known varieties have a conserved N-terminal part, which contains a FERM domain (a domain found in most cytoskeletal-membrane organizing proteins). The FERM domain is followed by an alpha-helical domain and a hydrophilic tail. Merlin can dimerize with itself and heterodimerize with other ERM family proteins.

Function 
Merlin is a membrane-cytoskeleton scaffolding protein, i.e. linking actin filaments to cell membrane or membrane glycoproteins. Human merlin is predominantly found in nervous tissue, but also in several other fetal tissues, and is mainly located in adherens junctions. Its tumor suppressor properties are  probably associated with contact-mediated growth inhibition. Drosophila merlin is expressed in embryonic hindgut, salivary glands, and imaginal discs, and has apparently a slightly different role than in vertebrates.

The phosphorylation of serine 518 is known to alter the functional state of merlin. The signaling pathway of merlin is proposed to include several salient cell growth controlling molecules, including eIF3c, CD44, protein kinase A, and p21 activated kinases.

Work in Drosophila identified Merlin as an upstream regulator of the Hippo tumor suppressor pathway, a function that is conserved in mammals. The Hippo pathway is a well conserved signalling pathway that coordinately regulates cell proliferation and apoptosis.

Mutations of the NF2 gene cause a human autosomal dominant disease called neurofibromatosis type 2. It is characterized by the development of tumors of the nervous system, most commonly of bilateral vestibular schwannomas (also called acoustic neuromas). NF2 belongs to the tumor suppressor group of genes.

Interactions 

Merlin (protein) has been shown to interact with:

 CUL4A, 
 DDB1,
 EZR, 
 HGS, 
 MED28, 
 RIT1, 
 SDCBP, 
 SPTBN1,  and
 VPRBP.

References

External links 
  GeneReviews/NCBI/NIH/UW entry on Neurofibromatosis 2
 FlyBase synopsis of gene Mer

Cytoskeleton
Peripheral membrane proteins
Human proteins
Tumor suppressor genes